Goya Department is a  department of Corrientes Province in Argentina.

External links
Goya website 
Federal website 

Departments of Corrientes Province